Tropidophora cuvieriana, common name the Cuvier  snail, is a species of mollusc in the family Pomatiidae. Once feared extinct, this large snail has been rediscovered. It is a poorly known species and both its breeding behavior and diet are unknown.

Distribution
This species occurs in Madagascar.

References

 Petit de la Saussaye, S. "Description de quelques Hélices nouvelles." Rev. Zool. Soc. Cuv 1841 (1841): 98–101.

Tropidophora